The 1894 Wisconsin Badgers football team represented the University of Wisconsin as an independent during the 1894 college football season. Led by first-year head coach Hiram O. Stickney, the Badgers compiled a record of 5–2. The team's captain was Theron Lyman.

Schedule

References

Wisconsin
Wisconsin Badgers football seasons
Wisconsin Badgers football